The 1996–97 Florida Panthers season was the Panthers' fourth season.

Offseason

Regular season

Final standings

Schedule and results

Playoffs
Following their remarkable run to the Stanley Cup Finals in the 1996 playoffs, the Panthers qualified for the 1997 Stanley Cup playoffs. As the fourth seed in the Eastern Conference, they played the fifth seeded New York Rangers. However, the Panthers were eliminated in five games.

Player statistics

Note: Pos = Position; GP = Games played; G = Goals; A = Assists; Pts = Points; +/- = plus/minus; PIM = Penalty minutes; PPG = Power-play goals; SHG = Short-handed goals; GWG = Game-winning goals
      MIN = Minutes played; W = Wins; L = Losses; T = Ties; GA = Goals-against; GAA = Goals-against average; SO = Shutouts; SA = Shots against; SV = Shots saved; SV% = Save percentage;

Awards and records

Transactions

Draft picks
Florida's draft picks at the 1996 NHL Entry Draft held at the Kiel Center in St. Louis, Missouri.

See also
1996–97 NHL season

References
 

F
F
Florida Panthers seasons
Florida Panthers
Florida Panthers